Notoceras is a genus of flowering plants belonging to the family Brassicaceae.

Its native range is the Canary Islands, Mauritania, Southeastern Spain, Northern Africa to Western Himalaya and Arabian Peninsula.

Species
Species:
 Notoceras bicorne (Aiton) Amo

References

Brassicaceae
Brassicaceae genera